Major General George Lammie (1891 – 17 June 1946) CBE MC was an officer in the British Army during World War II.

Biography
Quoted from Nick Smart, Biographical Dictionary of British Generals during the Second World War, p. 180

"Born in Glasgow and educated at George Watson's College, Edinburgh, Lammie was gazetted from the London Scottish (Territorial Force) to the Royal Scots in 1914. His First War service was in France, where he was mentioned in despatches and awarded the MC.

Married in 1918, Lammie attended the Staff College, Camberley, 1924–1925, and transferred to the Seaforth Highlanders in 1930. Mentioned in despatches for his part in operations in Palestine 1936–1937, he served on the staff at the War Office 1938–1939.

A staff officer with Home Forces in 1940 and appointed to command 147th Infantry Brigade 1940–1941, Lammie endured garrison duties in Iceland for a year. Briefly Deputy Adjutant and QMG, Scottish Command, in 1941, he was Director of Quartering at the War Office 1941–1944. Commander of 3 District, Italy, Central Mediterranean Force, 1944–1945, he retired from the army in 1945."

Command history
 1938–1939 General Staff Officer, 1 War Office
 1939–1940 General Staff Officer, 1 Home Forces
 1940–1941 Commanding Officer, 147th Brigade, Iceland
 1941 Deputy Adjutant and Quartermaster-General Scottish Command
 1941–1944 Director of Quartering, War Office
 1944–1945 District Officer Commanding, Headquarters 3rd District, Central Mediterranean Force
 1945 Aide-de-Camp to the King

Bibliography

External links
Generals of World War II

1891 births
1946 deaths
British Army major generals
British Army personnel of World War I
British Army generals of World War II
London Scottish soldiers
Royal Scots officers
Seaforth Highlanders officers
Graduates of the Staff College, Camberley
British military personnel of the 1936–1939 Arab revolt in Palestine
Commanders of the Order of the British Empire
Recipients of the Military Cross
People educated at George Watson's College
Military personnel from Glasgow